Murder by Phone (also known as Bells and The Calling) is a 1982 science fiction slasher film directed by Michael Anderson. Its plot follows a series of murders committed by a disgruntled phone company employee who designs a device that kills victims when they answer their telephones.

Cast 
 Richard Chamberlain as Nat Bridger
 John Houseman as Stanley Markowitz
 Sara Botsford as Ridley Taylor
 Robin Gammell as Noah Clayton
 Gary Reineke as Lt. Meara
 Barry Morse as Fred Waites
 Alan Scarfe as John Websole
 James B. Douglas as Jack Gilsdorf
 Ken Pogue as Fil Thorner
 Neil Munro as Winters
 Tom Butler as Detective Tamblyn
 Colin Fox as Dr. Leon Alderman
 Jefferson Mappin as Alex
 Luba Goy as Beth Freemantle
 Lenore Zann as Connie Lawson
 George R. Robertson as George Lord
 Angus MacInnes as Colin Bartell
 Neil Affleck as Phone Tracer

Novel
The movie was preceded by a novel called Phone Call written by the screenwriters Michael Butler and Dennis Shryack under the pseudonym Jon Messman. It was published in 1979, three years before the film version. It is never credited in the film's credits. The link was mentioned on the cover in later editions of the book.

Production
Murder by Phone was filmed in 1980 in Toronto, Ontario, Canada.

The score by John Barry is electronic, played entirely with synthesisers. This was a rarity for Barry. Whilst he composed and conducted the score, it was performed by Jonathan Elias and John Petersen. Elias later went on to work with Barry on the scores for Jagged Edge and A View to a Kill.

Release
Murder by Phone was released in the United States on October 8, 1982.

Critical response
Leonard Maltin noted the film's cast and direction as being legitimately "talented," but deemed the film a "hoary horror exercise."

Home media
Murder by Phone was released on VHS by Warner Home Video in 1984. The VHS was reissued in 1998.

Notes

References

Works cited

External links 

1982 horror films
1982 films
American slasher films
Canadian slasher films
1980s slasher films
1980s science fiction horror films
Films directed by Michael Anderson
Films scored by John Barry (composer)
Films shot in Toronto
New World Pictures films
English-language Canadian films
Canadian horror thriller films
American mystery thriller films
Canadian mystery films
American science fiction horror films
Canadian science fiction horror films
American horror thriller films
American mystery horror films
Techno-horror films
1980s English-language films
1980s American films
1980s Canadian films